is a Japanese golf-themed manga series written by Nobuhiro Sakata and illustrated by Eiji Kazama. It was serialized in Shogakukan's the seinen manga magazine Big Comic Original from 1990 to 2022, with its chapters collected in 84 tankōbon volumes as of August 2022. In 1994, the manga won the 39th Shogakukan Manga Award in the general category.

Plot
The series focuses on Keisuke Okita, who takes up golf at the age of 24 and through talent, hard work, and good coaching quickly turns pro. After a good performance in Asian professional golf tours, he enters the British Open, where he falls in love with his caddy, Lily. He later participates other major golf tournaments, including the Masters Tournament.

Characters

Protagonist of the series. Keisuke had to leave university because of family problems, and now at the age of 24 has joined Kanuma country club as a trainee.

Publication

Big Comic Original since 1990. Shogakukan has collected its chapters into individual tankōbon volumes. The first volume was released on March 30, 1991. As of August 30, 2022, eighty-four volumes have been released. The latest chapter was published on May 20, 2022, and the series was put on hiatus; on October 4 of the same year, it was announced that Kazama died of pancreatic cancer at 75 on October 2. Kazama's last chapter was posthumously published in Big Comic Original on December 5, 2022.

Reception
In 1994, Kaze no Daichi won the 39th Shogakukan Manga Award in the general category. In 2021, the series ranked 88th on  TV Asahi's "Manga General Election" poll in which 150,000 people voted for their "Most Favorite Manga".

References

External links
  
 

Golf in anime and manga
Seinen manga
Shogakukan manga
Winners of the Shogakukan Manga Award for general manga